Mopla is a genus of grasshoppers in the subfamily Catantopinae with no tribe assigned.  Species can be found in India.

Species
The Orthoptera Species File lists:
 Mopla guttata Henry, 1940 - type species
 Mopla rubra Henry, 1940

References

External Links 
 

Acrididae genera
Catantopinae 
Orthoptera of Asia